Bhadra or Bhadrapada or Bhādo or Bhadraba 
(Bengali: ভাদ্র bhādro; Hindi: भादों bhādo; Sanskrit: भाद्रपद bhādrapada;  Bhādra;  Bhadraba) is the sixth month of the Hindu calendar, which falls in August and September of the Gregorian calendar. In India's national civil calendar (Shaka calendar), Bhadra is the sixth month of the year, beginning on 23 August and ending on 22 September. In Vedic Jyotish, Bhadra begins with the Sun's entry into Leo and is usually the fifth month of the year. 

In lunar religious calendars, Bhadra begins on the new moon or full moon in August or September and is the sixth month of the year. The festival of Ganesha Chaturthi, which celebrates the birthday of Ganesha, is observed from 4-10 Bhadrapada in the bright fortnight (Shukla Paksha) and is the main holiday of the year in Maharashtra. Per Shaka calendar, the dark fortnight (Krishna Paksha) of Bhadrapada is reserved for the veneration of the dead. This period is known as Pitru Paksha.

In the Vaishnava calendar, Hrishikesh governs this month.

Lord Krishna was born on the eighth day of Krishna Paksha of Bhadrapada (according to the purnimanta tradition) and Lady Radha was born on the eighth day of Shukla Paksha of Bhadrapada. Vaishnavas and some Shaivites fast during the whole month of "Purattasi" in Tamil Nadu and visit Vaishnava temples on Saturday.

Events

Festivals
 Krishna Janmashtami (purnimanta tradition)
Radhastami / Radha Janmashtami
 Haritalika Tritiya
 Ganesh Chaturthi
 Karam
 Rishi Panchami
 Shukla Chaturdashi: Anant Chaturdashi
 Purnima: Madhu Purnima

See also

 Astronomical basis of the Hindu calendar
Hindu units of measurement
 Hindu astronomy
 Jyotish

References

06